The least bittern (Ixobrychus exilis) is a small heron, the smallest member of the family Ardeidae found in the Americas.

Taxonomy
The least bittern was formally described in 1789 by the German naturalist Johann Friedrich Gmelin in his revised and expanded edition of Carl Linnaeus's Systema Naturae. He placed it with the herons, cranes, storks and bitterns in the genus Ardea and coined the binomial name Ardea exilis. Gmelin based his description on the "minute bittern" from Jamaica that had been included by the English ornithologist John Latham in his multi-volume work A General Synopsis of Birds. Latham did not specify how he had obtained the specimen. The least bittern is now one of ten species placed in the genus Ixobrychus that was introduced in 1828 by the Swedish naturalist Gustaf Johan Billberg. The genus name combines the Ancient Greek ixias, a reed-like plant and brukhomai, to bellow. The specific epithet exilis is Latin meaning "little" or "slender".

Six subspecies are recognised:
 I. e. exilis (Gmelin, 1789) – Breeding: east Canada and east, southwest USA. Non-breeding: Central America and West Indies
 I. e. pullus Van Rossem, 1930 – northwest Mexico
 I. e. erythromelas (Vieillot, 1817) – east Panama and north South America to north Bolivia and north Argentina
 I. e. limoncochae Norton, DW, 1965 – east Ecuador
 I. e. bogotensis Chapman, 1914 – central Colombia
 I. e. peruvianus Bond, J, 1955 – west central Peru

North American birds were formerly divided into two subspecies, eastern (I. e. exilis) and western (I. e. hesperis), but this is no longer believed to be a valid distinction.

The least bittern forms a superspecies with the little bittern and yellow bittern.

Cory's least bittern 
A dark rufous morph, I. e. neoxenus, termed "Cory's bittern" or "Cory's least bittern" was originally described by Charles Cory as a separate species in 1885 from a specimen collected on or near the Caloosahatchee River, near Lake Okeechobee, in southwest Florida. Cory stated that the specimen was "without doubt perfectly distinct from any other known species". Further specimens followed over the next decades from Florida, Michigan, Illinois, Wisconsin, Ohio, and Ontario.

Initially, Cory's least bittern was accepted as a valid species, with Elliott Coues and Richard Bowdler Sharpe both including it in published species lists. As early as 1892, however, doubts were raised about the validity of Cory's least bittern as a separate species. Nonetheless, in 1896 Frank Chapman wrote a detailed paper supporting its retention as a valid species. Outram Bangs later argued, in 1915, that this view was wrong and proposed that Cory's should become a junior synonym of least bittern. This view eventually prevailed, with the American Ornithologists' Union removing the species from their list of North American birds in 1923, although others held dissenting views until at least 1928.

Cory's least bittern was once fairly common, but it is now exceptionally rare, with only five sightings since 1950. More than 50% of the historical records are from the Toronto region of Ontario. Initially known only from the North American subspecies exilis, it was first recorded in the South America subspecies erthyromelas in 1967.

Description

The least bittern is one of the smallest herons in the world, with perhaps only the dwarf bittern and the black-backed bittern averaging smaller in length.

The bird's underparts and throat are white with light brown streaks. Its face and the sides of the neck are light brown; it has yellow eyes and a yellow bill. The adult male is glossy greenish-black on the back and crown; the adult female is glossy brown on these parts. They show light brown parts on the wings in flight.

These birds make cooing and clucking sounds, usually in early morning or near dusk.

Behavior

The least bittern is an elusive bird. They spend much time straddling reeds. When alarmed, the least bittern freezes in place with its bill pointing up, turns its front and both eyes toward the source of alarm, and sometimes sways to resemble wind-blown marsh vegetation. This is perhaps a predator-avoidance behaviour, since its small size makes the bittern vulnerable to many potential predators. Thanks to its habit of perching among the reeds, the least bittern can feed from the surface of water that would be too deep for the wading strategy of other herons. The least bittern and much larger and different-looking American bittern often occupy the same wetlands but may have relatively little interaction because of differences in foraging habits, preferred prey, and timing of breeding cycles. The least bittern arrives on its breeding grounds about a month after the American bittern and leaves one or two months earlier.

Breeding
These birds nest in large marshes with dense vegetation from southern Canada to northern Argentina. The nest is a well-concealed platform built from cattails and other marsh vegetation. The female lays four or five eggs, in extreme cases from two to seven. The eggs are pale blue or green. Both parents feed the young by regurgitating food. A second brood is often produced in a season.

These birds migrate from the northern parts of their range in winter for the southernmost coasts of the United States and areas further south, travelling at night.

Food and feeding
They mainly eat fish, frogs, crustaceans and insects, which they capture with quick jabs of their bill while climbing through marsh plants.

Status
The numbers of these birds have declined in some areas due to loss of habitat. They are still fairly common but are more often heard than seen. As the species has a large range and a large total population, the International Union for Conservation of Nature has assessed its conservation status as being of "Least Concern". The least bittern is protected under the Migratory Bird Treaty Act of 1918.
A Least Bittern was saved in Bushwick Brooklyn on October 8th by Bennington Show Producer Chris Stanley. He named the bird Bushy and after taking it to a bird rescue he will take it into his home.

References

External links
 Least bittern images by Monte M. Taylor at tsuru-bird.net, © 2009 
 Least Bittern at Field Guide: Birds of the World on Flickr
 Least Bittern Species Account – Cornell Lab of Ornithology
 Cory's least bittern and Cory's least bittern at Pantanal, YouTube videos
 Cory's least bittern in Royal Ontario Museum, Toronto, photographs of museum specimens
 
 

Least Bittern
Least Bittern
Birds of the Americas
Birds of the United States
Birds of Canada
Birds of the Dominican Republic
Birds of Puerto Rico
Birds of Trinidad and Tobago
Birds of South America
Birds of North America
Least Bittern
Least Bittern